Hopkinton High School is a public, co-educational secondary school located in Hopkinton, New Hampshire. In 2014, 2015, and 2016 it was ranked 1st among New Hampshire's public schools by  US News. Hopkinton High School has also been awarded a national silver medal and is ranked nationally #972 of the 21,000 public schools in the US.

Notable alumni
Tina Satter, New York City-based playwright and director

References

External links
Hopkinton High School website

Schools in Merrimack County, New Hampshire
Public high schools in New Hampshire
Hopkinton, New Hampshire